Chhatiwan may refer to:
Chhatiwan, Narayani
Chhatiwan, Seti